This is a list of notable people from San Francisco, California. It includes people who were born or raised in, lived in, or spent significant portions of their lives in San Francisco, or for whom San Francisco is a significant part of their identity, as well as music groups founded in San Francisco. This list is in order by primary field of notability and then in alphabetical order by last name.

Academics
 Andrew Smith Hallidie (1836–1900) promoter of the first cable car line, regent of the University of California from 1868 to 1900
 Phoebe Hearst (1842–1919) first woman Regent of the University of California, socialite, philanthropist, feminist and suffragist
 Terry Karl (born 1947), professor of Latin American Studies at Stanford University

Artists and designers

Architects 
 Edward Charles Bassett (1922–1999) San Francisco based architect, designed many of the buildings in San Francisco with Skidmore, Owings and Merrill.
Vernon DeMars (1908–2005), architect and professor; born in San Francisco.
Joseph Esherick (1914–1998), residential architect.
 Richard Gage, San Francisco based architect and 9/11 activist, founder of Architects & Engineers for 9/11 Truth
 George W. Homsey (1926–2019), known for design of BART stations, among other things.
 Edgar Mathews (1866–1946), architect that designed many houses in Pacific Heights, often in a Tudor Revival influenced style with half-timbered, half-stucco, he resided in San Francisco at 2980 Vallejo Street.
 George Matsumoto (1922–2016), Japanese-American Modernist architect, born in San Francisco.
 Bernard Maybeck (1892–1957), architect in the Arts and Crafts Movement.
Julia Morgan (1872–1957), architect; born in San Francisco.
Timothy Ludwig Pflueger (1892–1946), architect, interior designer and architectural lighting designer; born in San Francisco
 Willis Polk (1867–1924), architect of many well-known buildings in San Francisco
William Wurster (1895–1973) architect, professor of architecture at University of California, Berkeley, and at MIT.

Designers 
Gilbert Baker (1951–2017), artist, gay rights activist, and designer of the rainbow flag, lived in San Francisco from the 1970s until 1994.
 Josh Begley (born 1984), digital artist and designer that works with data visualization, born in San Francisco
 Yves Béhar (born 1967), industrial designer, resides in San Francisco in Cow Hollow.
Stanlee Gatti (born 1955), celebrated event designer, art fair founder, and local arts administrator; moved to San Francisco in 1978.
 Gary Grimshaw (1946–2014), music poster artist
 Frank Kozik (born 1946), music poster artist, toy designer, resides in San Francisco

Fashion, apparel 
Donald Fisher (1928–2009) and Doris F. Fisher (born 1931), apparel entrepreneurs, co-founders of The Gap, Inc; both were born, raised and lived in San Francisco.
Jessica McClintock (1930–2021), fashion designer.
Levi Strauss (1829–1902), German-born American Gold Rush-era businessman who founded the first company to manufacture blue jeans, Levi Strauss & Co., headquartered in San Francisco
William Ware Theiss (1930–1992), costume designer.
Douglas Tompkins (1943–2015), apparel entrepreneur, co-founder of Esprit Holdings, and later The North Face.
Susie Tompkins Buell (born 1943), apparel entrepreneur, co-founder of Esprit Holdings.

Fiber art, textile design 
 Dominic Di Mare (born 1932), fiber arts, mixed media sculptor, watercolorist; born in San Francisco and lived there for many years.
Trude Guermonprez (1910–1976), German-born American textile artist, designer and educator, known for her tapestry landscapes; lived in San Francisco from 1951 until 1976.
 Kay Sekimachi (born 1926), Japanese–American fiber artist best known for her three-dimensional woven monofilament hangings; born in San Francisco and taught at City College of San Francisco.

Illustrators, comic book artists 
 Arthur Adams (born 1963), comic book artist known for his work on Longshot and Monkeyman and O'Brien, as of 2001 he lives in San Francisco
 Scott Adams (born 1957), Dilbert creator
 Robert Crumb (born 1943), cartoonist, started his career in San Francisco
 Rube Goldberg (1883–1970), American cartoonist, sculptor, author, engineer, and inventor.
 Larry Gonick (born 1946), cartoonist and comic artist, born in San Francisco
 Aline Kominsky-Crumb (born 1948), cartoonist, lived in San Francisco for many years
 Paul Terry (1887–1971), cartoonist and film producer who created Mighty Mouse
 Mark Ulriksen (born 1957), The New Yorker illustrator, lives in Cole Valley, San Francisco

Jewelry 
 Vera Allison (1902–1993), American Modernist jeweler, and abstract painter; born in San Francisco.
 Irena Brynner (1917–2003), sculptor and jewelry designer, part of the mid-century jewelry movement
 Margaret De Patta (1903–1964), jewelry, part of the mid-century jewelry movement; lived and died in San Francisco.
 Peter Macchiarini (1909–2001), and his spouse Virginia Macchiarini, jewelry designers and have a workshop in North Beach
 Merry Renk (1921–2012), jewelry design, goldsmith; lived and died in San Francisco.
 Byron August Wilson (1918–1992), jewelry design and sculptor
 Bob Winston (1915–2003), jeweler, sculptor, and educator; active and founding member of the Metal Arts Guild of San Francisco

Mixed media, installation 
 Mark Adams (1925–2006), public art, watercolors of still life subjects, tapestry designers, and stained glass artist
 Craig Baldwin (born 1952), experimental filmmaker
 Jim Campbell (born 1956), artist known for his LED light works
 Bruce Conner (1933–2008), multimedia artist, lived in San Francisco in the mid-1960s
 Pam DeLuco (born 1968), textile and fiber artist, papermaker and book arts, based in San Francisco
 Jo Hanson (1918–2007), environmental artist and activist
 David Ireland (1930–2009), American sculptor, conceptual artist and Minimalist architect
 Aaron Kraten (born 1974), mixed media artist
 Gay Outlaw (born 1959), sculptor, photographer & printmaker based in San Francisco.
 Rex Ray (1956–2015), graphic designer and collage artist, lived and worked in the Mission District.
 Reminisce (born 1970), also known as Ruby Rose Neri; street artist, sculptor, painter, part of the Mission School art movement
Antonio Sotomayor (1902–1985), Bolivian born muralist, ceramicist, illustrator.
Carlos Villa (1936–2013), Filipino-American mixed media visual artist, painter, curator and educator; born and raise in the Tenderloin neighborhood.
Al Wong (born 1939), experimental filmmaker and mixed media installation artist

Painters 
 Tauba Auerbach (born 1981), visual artist, painter, born and raised in San Francisco
 Ruth Armer (1896–1977), abstract painter, lithographer, fine art teacher and collector
 Robert Bechtle (born 1932), American photorealist painter.
 Bernice Bing (1936–1998), painter
 Warren Eugene Brandon (1916–1977), painter, born in San Francisco
 Joan Brown (1938–1990), painter
 Lenore Chinn (born 1949), painter
 Jess Collins (1923–2004), painter
 Jay DeFeo (1929–1989), visual artist, a co-founder of Six Gallery
 Pele de Lappe (1916–2007), social realist painter and printmaker, and political cartoonist. She was born in San Francisco and lived there many years.
 Richard Diebenkorn (1922–1993), painter
 Guy Diehl (born 1949), still life painter
 Maynard Dixon (1875–1946), painter of the American West.
 Kevin Geary (born 1952), English portrait and abstract artist, lived in San Francisco in 1998 and 1999.
 Howard Hack (1923–2015), representational painter
 Saburo Hasegawa (1906–1957), painter, calligrapher
 Wally Hedrick (1928–2003), painter
 Ester Hernandez (born 1944), Chicana artist and painter
 Peregrine Honig (born 1976), painter
 Chris Johanson (born 1968), painter, part of the Mission School art movement
 Kali (1918–1998), Polish painter and World War II veteran, moved to San Francisco in 1953 and died in San Francisco in 1998.
 Margaret Kilgallen (1967–2001), painter, part of the Mission School art movement
 Jane Kim (born 1981), painter, science illustrator and the founder of Ink Dwell studio, based in San Francisco
 Anna Elizabeth Klumpke (1856–1942), portrait and genre painter born in San Francisco, life partner of French painter Rosa Bonheur (1822–1899).
 Barry McGee (born 1966), painter, part of the Mission School art movement
 Nathan Oliveira (1928–2010), painter, lived in San Francisco for many years, part of the Bay Area Figurative Movement
 Frederick E. Olmsted (1911–1990), painter, born and raised in San Francisco, former student of Ralph Stackpole and he has a mural is at CCSF.
 Jules Eugene Pages (1867–1946), painter
 Deborah Remington (1930–2010), abstract painter
 Lala Eve Rivol (1913–1996), worked with the Works Project Administration to illustrate rock art sites in the western United States
 Charles Dorman Robinson (1847–1933), painter
 Clare Rojas (born 1976), artist, painter, part of the Mission School art movement
 Peter Saul (born 1934), American painter associated with Pop Art, Surrealism, and Expressionism.
 David Simpson (born 1928), abstract painter and co-founder of Six Gallery
 Nell Sinton (1910–1997), abstract painter
Ralph Stackpole (1885–1973) sculpture, social realist painter and muralist, active in San Francisco in 1920 and 1930s, contributed to the Coit Tower mural project.
 Wayne Thiebaud (1920-2021), pop artist
 Leo Valledor (1936–1989), Filipino-American painter who pioneered the hard-edge painting style; born and raised in the Fillmore district.
 Ted Vasin (born 1966), painter and sound artist
 Martin Wong (1946–1999) painter from New York's East Village art scene of the 1980s, grew up in San Francisco's Chinatown.
 Bernard Zakheim (1898–1985), muralist

Photographers 
 Ansel Adams (1902–1984), photographer and environmentalist, born and raised in San Francisco.
 Victor Burgin (born 1941), photographer
 John Gutmann (1905–1998), German-born American photographer and painter
 Treu Ergeben Hecht (1875–1937), Tahiti-born American photographer
 Michael Jang (born 1951), photographer
 Dorothea Lange (1895–1965), photographer
 Fred Lyon (1924–2022), photographer

Printmakers 
 Kathan Brown (born 1935), intaglio, founder of Crown Point Press.
 Grafton Tyler Brown (1841–1918), lithographer; first African-American artist to create works depicting the Pacific West
 Ernest de Soto (1923–2014), lithographer, founder of de Soto Workshop.
 Rupert García (born 1941), silkscreen, one of the co-founders of Galería de la Raza, and part of the San Francisco Bay Area Chicano Art Movement.
 Frank LaPena (1937–2019), Nomtipom-Wintu American Indian artist working in many mediums including printmaking, professor, curator, ceremonial dancer; born and raised in San Francisco.
 Ralph Maradiaga (1934–1985), silkscreen, one of the co-founders of Galería de la Raza, and part of the San Francisco Bay Area Chicano Art Movement.
 Jack Stauffacher (1920–2017), letterpress, typographer
 Beth Van Hoesen (1926–2010), printmaker, painter, and drawer; she was known for her animal artwork and Castro District portraits.

Sculptors 
 Ruth Asawa (1926–2013), sculptor, lived and died in San Francisco
 Beniamino Benvenuto Bufano (1890–1970), sculptor, lived and died in San Francisco
 Alexander Calder (1898–1976), sculptor
 Vincent Fecteau (born 1969), sculptor
 Sargent Johnson (1888–1967) sculptor, one of the first African-American artists working in California to achieve a national reputation
Freda Koblick (1920–2011), American acrylic artist and sculptor
 Ron Nagle (born 1939), sculptor, musician and songwriter
 Manuel Neri (born 1930), sculptor, part of the Bay Area Figurative Movement
 Gottardo Piazzoni (1872–1945), painter, muralist, sculptor
 Raymond Puccinelli (1904–1986), sculptor and educator; born and raised in San Francisco, lived in Italy in later life.
 Richard Serra (born 1962), artist
 Adrien Voisin (1890–1979), bronze sculptor and architectural sculptor; restored the Albion Castle from 1930s to 1950s.
 Beatrice Wood (1893–1998), ceramicist

Business
 Albert Abrams (1863–1924), inventor of medical equipment in the field of electricity therapy
 Sam Altman (born 1985), chairman of Y Combinator and co-chairman of OpenAI. 
 Melvin Belli (1907–1996), lawyer known as "The King of Torts", died in San Francisco
 Friedrich Bendixen (1864–1920), American-born German banker
 Marc Benioff (born 1964), founder & co-CEO of Salesforce
 Nathan Blecharczyk (born 1983), chief strategy officer & co-founder of Airbnb
 Thomas Henry Blythe (born Thomas Williams, 1822–1883), emigrated to the San Francisco from Wales and became a wealthy capitalist.
 Bill Bowes (1926–2016), venture capitalist, philanthropist, and co-founder of U.S. Venture Partners
 Luke Brugnara (born 1963), real estate investor
 Brian Chesky (born 1981), CEO & co-founder of Airbnb
 Ron Conway (born 1951), angel investor and philanthropist

 Barry Diller (born 1942), co-founder of Fox Broadcasting Company

 Jack Dorsey (born 1976), co-founder & CEO of Twitter, founder & CEO of Square

 Mickey Drexler (born 1944), CEO of J. Crew and Gap Inc.
 Donald Fisher (1928–2009), co-founder of the Gap clothing company
 Doris F. Fisher (born 1931), co-founder of the Gap clothing company
 Philip Arthur Fisher (1907–2004), investor, author, entrepreneur
Aaron Fleishhacker (1820–1898), paper box manufacturer, Gold rush-era entrepreneur, local philanthropist 
 Joe Gebbia (born 1981), co-founder & Chief Product Officer of Airbnb
 Gordon Getty (born 1934), oil philanthropist and composer
 Warren Hellman (1934–2011), private equity investor and founder of Hardly Strictly Bluegrass festival
 Elizabeth Holmes (born 1984), founder and former CEO of Theranos
 Jonathan Ive (born 1967), chief design officer of Apple, industrial designer
 Jess Jackson (1930–2011), wine entrepreneur and founder of Kendall-Jackson wine company
 Steve Jobs (1955–2011), co-founder of Apple Inc., born in and adopted in San Francisco
 Max Levchin (born 1975), PayPal co-founder
 Lew Hing (1858–1934) Chinese-born American industrialist and banker; founder of Chinatown in San Francisco, as well as Chinatown in Oakland, California.
 James Lick (1796–1876), real estate investor, carpenter, piano builder, land baron, and patron of the sciences.
 Larry Livermore (born 1947), founder of Lookout Records
 Marissa Mayer (born 1975), information technology executive, and co-founder of Lumi Labs. Mayer formerly served as the president and chief executive officer of Yahoo!
 Jesse B. McCargar (1879–1954), banker and industrialist
 Pete McDonough (1872–1947), Bail Bonds Broker, called "the Fountainhead of Corruption" in 1937 police graft investigation
 Morris Meyerfeld Jr. (1855–1935), German-born entrepreneur and theater owner (Orpheum Vaudeville Circuit)
 Gordon E. Moore (born 1929), co-founder of Intel Corporation, author of Moore's law
 Michael Moritz (born 1954), venture capitalist at Sequoia Capital
 Craig Newmark (born 1951), founder of Craigslist
 Alexis Ohanian (born 1983), co-founder of Reddit
 Jack O'Neill (1923–2017), founder of O'Neill surf equipment
 Jay Paul, real estate developer
 Mark Pincus (born 1966), founder of Zynga
 Bob Pritikin (1929–2022), advertising executive, creative director, author, art collector, and bon vivant
 William Chapman Ralston (1826–1875), founder of the Bank of California
 Kevin Rose (born 1977), internet entrepreneur who co-founded Revision3, Digg, Pownce, and Milk
 Charles R. Schwab (born 1937), businessman, founder of Schwab investment firm
 Theresa Sparks (born 1949), CEO of sex toy company Good Vibrations
 Tom Steyer (born 1957), hedge fund manager and political activist
 Levi Strauss (1829–1902), German-American Gold Rush-era businessman who founded the first company to manufacture blue jeans, Levi Strauss & Co., headquartered in San Francisco
 Rikki Streicher (1922–1994) LGBT leader, bar owner and co-founder of the Gay Games
 Adolph Sutro (1830–1898) German-American engineer, business man, politician and philanthropist who served as the 24th mayor of San Francisco from 1895 until 1897
 Aaron Swartz (1986–2011), co-founder of Reddit
 Eric Swenson (1946–2011), co-founder of Thrasher Magazine & Independent Truck Company
 Peter Thiel (born 1967), co-founder of PayPal, founder of Clarium Capital
 Richard M. Tobin, (1866–1952), president of Hibernia Bank and Minister to the Netherlands
George Treat (1819–1907) early Gold Rush-era pioneer in the Mission District, of San Francisco, a businessman, abolitionist, a member of the first Committee of Vigilance of San Francisco, and horse racing enthusiast.
 Walter Varney, (1888–1967), aviation pioneer, founded the predecessors to both United Airlines and Continental Airlines
 Fausto Vitello (1946–2006), creator of Thrasher Magazine and co-creator of Independent Trucks
 Evan Williams (born 1972), co-founder and CEO of Twitter, founder of Medium and blogger
 Ilya Zhitomirskiy (1989–2011), co-founder of Diaspora
 Mark Zuckerberg (born 1984), co-founder and CEO of Facebook

Chefs 
 Mario Batali (born 1960), chef
 Danny Bowien (born 1982), chef and restaurateur; founder of Mission Chinese Food
 Cecilia Chiang (1920–2020), chef, restaurateur, and cookbook writer
 Chris Cosentino, celebrity chef, restaurateur and reality television personality
 Dominique Crenn (born 1965), chef and owner of the two Michelin stars rated, Atelier Crenn and Petit Crenn in San Francisco
 Gary Danko, chef and restaurateur  
 Traci Des Jardins (born 1967), chef and restaurateur, previously Jardinière
 Melissa King (born 1983), winner of Top Chef
 Corey Lee (born 1977) chef and restaurateur; founder of Benu.
 George Mardikian (1903–1977), chef and restaurateur; founder of Omar Khayyam's restaurant
 Thomas McNaughton (born 1983), chef, restaurateur, and cookbook writer, Flour and Water
 Michael Mina (born 1969), chef, restaurateur
 Daniel Patterson, chef, food writer, and owner of Coi from 2006 until 2022.
 Judy Rodgers (1956–2013), chef, cookbook writer, restaurateur; founder of Zuni Cafe
 Ron Siegel, chef in San Francisco, from 2002 to 2016.
 Jeremiah Tower (born 1942), chef at Chez Panisse and Stars
 René Verdon (1924–2011), chef and owner of Le Trianon from 1972 until 1985.
 Martin Yan (born 1948), television chef

Crime 
 David Carpenter (born 1930), also known as the Trailside Killer, a serial killer on hiking trails around the Bay Area; born and raised in San Francisco.

 Raymond "Shrimp Boy" Chow (born 1959), Hong Kong-born felon with ties to a San Francisco Chinatown street gang and an organized crime syndicate.

 Richard Allen Davis (born 1954), career criminal convicted of killing Polly Klaas; born and raised in San Francisco.

 The Doodler, also known as the Black Doodler, an unidentified serial killer believed responsible for up to 16 murders and three assaults of men in San Francisco, between January 1974 and September 1975. He had a habit of sketching his victims prior to their sexual encounters and slayings by stabbing.

 Alice Maud Hartley (c. 1864 – 1907), she murdered Nevada State Senator Murray D. Foley by gunshot in 1894.
 Jim Jones (1931–1978), cult leader of the Peoples Temple.
 Leonard Lake (1945-1985), serial killer alongside his accompliance Charles Ng.

 Pete McDonough (1872–1947), crime boss working alongside his brother Thomas, nicknamed the "King of the Tenderloin".

 Earle Nelson (1897–1928), serial killer and necrophile.
 The Zodiac Killer, unidentified serial killer active in the 1960s.

Entertainment industry

Actors 
 Gracie Allen (1895–1964) actress, comedian, born in San Francisco
 Dianna Agron (born 1986), actress
 W. Kamau Bell (born 1973), comic, television host
 Bill Bixby (1934–1993), actor
 Joan Blackman (born 1938), actress
 Mel Blanc (1908–1989), voiceover actor
 Lisa Bonet (born 1967), actress
 Michael Bowen (born 1953), actor, son of Beat generation artist Michael Bowen (Sr.)
 Benjamin Bratt (born 1963), actor
 Todd Bridges (born 1965), actor
 Kari Byron (born 1974), television personality
 Scott Capurro (born 1962), comedian, actor
 Colleen Camp (born 1953), actress
 Carol Channing (1921–2019), actress
 Kevin Cheng (born 1969), actor
 Mandy Cho (born 1982), actress
 Margaret Cho (born 1968), comedian, actress
 Jamie Chung (born 1983), actress
 William Collier Jr. (1902–1987), silent film and stage actor
 Darren Criss (born 1987), actor in Glee
 Eric Dane (born 1972), actor
 Ellen DeGeneres (born 1958), comedian, television personality
 Dimitri Diatchenko (1968–2020), actor and musician
 Minnie Dupree (1875–1947), actress
 Clint Eastwood (born 1930), actor and film director
 Barbara Eden (born 1931), actress
 Richard Egan (1921-1987), actor
 Jimmie Fails (born 1994), actor, screenwriter
 Kurt Fuller (born 1953), actor
 Kathy Gori (born 1951), actress
 Danny Glover (born 1946), actor
 Tom Hanks (born 1956), actor

 Jacob Hopkins (born 2002), actor

 China Kantner (born 1971), actress

 Bruce Lee (1940–1973), actor and martial artist
 Sondra Locke (1944–2018), actress and film director
 Marjorie Lord (1918–2015), actress
 Leslie Mann (born 1972), actress, born in San Francisco
 Cheech Marin (born 1946), actor
 Marc Maron (born 1963), comedian & podcaster
 Edna McClure (born c. 1888), Broadway actress
 Bridgit Mendler (born 1992), actress and singer
 Vera Michelena (1885–1961), actress, dancer and singer
 Melissa Ng (born 1972), Hong Kong television actress, raised in San Francisco
 Larisa Oleynik (born 1981), actress
 Patton Oswalt (born 1969), comedian
 Brian Posehn (born 1966), comedian
 Paula Poundstone (born 1959), comedian and panelist on NPR's Wait, Wait...Don't Tell Me
 Rob Schneider (born 1963), actor
 Liev Schreiber (born 1967), actor
 Harry Shum Jr. (born 1982), actor
 Alicia Silverstone (born 1976), actress
 Genevieve Stebbins (1857–1934), actress, author, teacher
 David Strathairn (born 1949), actor
 Sharon Stone (born 1958), actress
 Lyle Talbot (1902–1996), actor
 Jeffrey Tambor (born 1944), actor
 Phillip Terry (1909–1993), actor
 Gregg Turkington (born 1967), a.k.a. Neil Hamburger
 Aisha Tyler (born 1970), actress and TV personality
 Terri J. Vaughn (born 1969), actress
 Mai Wells (1862–1941), actress 
 Stuart Whitman (1928–2020), actor
 Robin Williams (1951–2014), comedian, actor
 Ali Wong (born 1982), actress, comic, writer
 BD Wong (born 1960), actor
 Natalie Wood (1938–1981), actress

Dancers
 Carol Doda (1937–2015), first public topless dancer
 Isadora Duncan (1877–1927), "mother" of modern dance
 Margaret Jenkins (born 1942), choreographer
 Sarah Lane (born 1984), ballet dancer

Filmmakers
 David Butler (1894–1979), film director, actor, writer and producer
 Chris Columbus (born 1958), director
 Francis Coppola (born 1939), film director, writer, producer, winery owner, San Francisco restaurateur
 Sofia Coppola (born 1971), director
 Delmer Daves (1904–1977), director
 David Fincher (born 1962), director
 Sarah Jacobson (1971–2004), film director, screenwriter, and producer
 Philip Kaufman (born 1936), film director
 George Kuchar (1942–2011),  underground film director and video artist, known for his "low-fi" aesthetic
 Mervyn LeRoy (1900–1987), director, producer, actor
 George Lucas (born 1944), director and producer
 Andy Luckey (born 1965), TV writer, producer, director
 Mary Eunice McCarthy (1899–1969), screenwriter, playwright, and author
 The Mitchell brothers, Jim and Artie, adult industry pioneers including adult cinema and adult film production
 Jon Moritsugu (born 1965), cult-underground filmmaker
 Jenni Olson (born 1962), film curator, filmmaker, author, and LGBT film historian
 Lourdes Portillo (born 1944), screenwriter and filmmaker
 Walter Shenson (1919–2000), film producer
 Cauleen Smith (born 1967), filmmaker and multimedia artist
 Joe Talbot (born 1991), director
 Jay Ward (1920–1989), creator and producer of animated TV series
 Wayne Wang (born 1949), director
 Tommy Wiseau, director of the cult film The Room

Promoters and managers
 Bill Graham (1931–1991), rock promoter, known for Winterland Ballroom, The Fillmore, Fillmore West and Bill Graham Presents
 Chet Helms (1942–2005), 1960s rock promoter
 Rock Scully (1941–2014), manager of the Grateful Dead

Theatre 
 David Belasco (1853–1931) theatrical producer, impresario, director and playwright, born in San Francisco
 Darren Criss (born 1987) Broadway actor, singer and songwriter, born in San Francisco
 Alice Oates (1849–1887) actress and pioneer of American musical theatre, lived and worked in San Francisco 
Carole Shorenstein Hays (born 1948), theatrical producer and owner of Curran Theatre.

Military 
 James Millikin Bevans (1899–1977), U.S. Air Force general
 Daniel Callaghan, (1890–1942) U.S. navy admiral and Medal of Honor recipient
 Robert L. Fair (1923–1983), U.S. Army general and Silver Star recipient
 Kenneth J. Houghton (1920–2006), U.S. Marine Corps general and Navy Cross recipient
 William Payne Jackson (1868–1945), U.S. Army major general
 William Harrington Leahy (1904–1986), U.S. Navy admiral
 Robert Houston Noble, U.S. Army general
 G. S. Patrick (1907–1999), U.S. Navy admiral and Navy Cross recipient
 William T. Shorey (1859–1919), first black San Francisco sea captain
 Thomas Selfridge (1882–1908), U.S. Army first lieutenant, Aviator, known for being the first person ever to die on a plane crash
 William Renwick Smedberg Jr., U.S. Army general
 Arthur Wolcott Yates, U.S. Army general
 John C. Young (1912–1987), U.S. Army officer, Chinatown leader
 Elmo R. Zumwalt Jr. (1920–2000), U.S. Navy admiral

Musicians and bands
 11/5, rap group
 4 Non Blondes, rock band
 8 Legged Monster, Jazz band based in San Francisco
 A.B. Skhy, 1960s blues-rock band
 The Ace of Cups, 1960s rock band
 The Aislers Set, indie rock band
 Allegiance, hardcore band
 American Music Club, indie rock band
 A Minor Forest, math rock band
 Lorin Ashton a.k.a. Bassnectar (born 1978), DJ & record producer
 Avengers, punk band
Penelope Houston (born 1958), singer
 Marty Balin (1949–2018), singer Jefferson Airplane
 Beau Brummels, (1960s relectro soul-punk), singer, signature song "I Left My Heart in San Francisco"
 Jello Biafra (born 1958), singer for Dead Kennedys
 Black Pearl, 1960s/1970s rock band
 Kat Bjelland (born 1963), bassist for Babes in Toyland
 Blue Cheer, early hard rock band
 Mike Bordin (born 1962), drummer for Faith No More and Ozzy Osbourne

 Paul Bostaph (born 1964), heavy metal drummer

 Mike Burkett a.k.a. "Fat Mike" (born 1967), bassist/songwriter for NOFX

 Kevin Cadogan (born 1970), guitarist, known for his work with the band Third Eye Blind on the albums Third Eye Blind and Blue* Jim Campilongo (born 1958), guitarist
 Michael Carabello (born 1947), percussionist with Santana
 Vanessa Carlton (born 1980), singer
 Caroliner, experimental band

 Adam Carson (born 1974), drummer for AFI
 Jack Casady (born 1944), bassist for Jefferson Airplane & Hot Tuna

 Tracy Chapman (born 1964), singer-songwriter
 Craig Chaquico (born 1954), rock, jazz and new age guitarist
 The Charlatans, folk rock & psychedelic rock band
 Chrome, foundational industrial rock band
 Todd Tamanend Clark (born 1952), poet and composer

 Clown Alley, punk band

 Counting Crows, alternative rock band
 Consolidated, alternative dance/industrial music band
 Jack Conte, songwriter, multi-instrumentalist, half of the musical duo Pomplamoose, and CEO of Patreon

 Patrick Cowley (1950–1982), disco composer

 Helios Creed (born 1953), singer/songwriter 
 Creeper Lagoon, rock band 
 Crime, early punk band
 Cypher in the Snow, queercore band
 Dead Kennedys, punk band 
 Dead to Me, punk band 
 Paul Desmond (1924–1977), jazz saxophonist
 The Dicks, early punk band
 Dave Dictor (born 1951), founder & singer of MDC
 Dieselhed, country punk band
 The Dils, early punk band
 Dominant Legs, indie pop group
 David Dondero (born 1969), singer/songwriter
 Jane Dornacker (1947–1986), songwriter for The Tubes, lead vocalist of Leila and the Snakes (originally from Albuquerque, New Mexico)
 DUH, alt/noise rock band
 The Dwarves, punk band
 John Dwyer (born 1974), multi-instrumentalist, vocalist, songwriter
 Mark Eitzel (born 1959), musician
 Hanni El Khatib (born 1981), a blues rock artist born in San Francisco, currently based in Los Angeles
 Engine 88, rock band
 Andy Ernst, punk rock music producer, engineer, musician, and songwriter
 Erase Errata, post-punk band
 Greg Errico (born 1948), drummer for many bands, most notably Sly & the Family Stone
 Faith No More, rock band
 Maude Fay (1878–1964), operatic dramatic soprano
 Jennifer Finch (born 1966), bassist for L7
 Flamin' Groovies, rock band
 Flipper, early punk band
 Michael Franti (born 1967), singer/songwriter
 Lars Frederiksen, guitarist/singer/songwriter with Rancid
 Bobby Freeman (1940–2017), rock, soul, and R&B singer and producer
 Frightwig, punk band

 The Fucking Champs, progressive punk band

 Girls, rock band

 Billy Gould (born 1963), bass guitarist for Faith No More

 Grass Widow, indie punk band

 Grateful Dead, rock band
 Jerry Garcia (1942–1995), psychedelic and folk-rock guitarist and singer for Grateful Dead
 Bob Weir (born 1947), songwriter/guitarist for Grateful Dead
 Phil Lesh (born 1949), bassist for Grateful Dead
 Mickey Hart (born 1943), drummer for Grateful Dead
 Bill Kreutzmann (born 1946), drummer for Grateful Dead
 Tom Constanten (born 1944), keyboardist for Grateful Dead
 Ron "Pigpen" McKernan (1949–1973), keyboardist and founding member of Grateful Dead
 Ryan Greene, record producer & sound engineer
 Grotus, industrial rock band

 Vince Guaraldi (1928–1976), jazz musician and pianist, born in San Francisco

 Sammy Hagar (born 1947), singer for Montrose & Van Halen
 Henry's Dress, indie pop band 
 Cindy Herron (born 1961), R&B singer in EnVogue, born in San Francisco

 Hickey, punk band

 Gary Holt (born 1964), thrash metal guitarist for Exodus

 Tiffany Hwang (born 1989), member of pop group Girls' Generation
 I Am Spoonbender, band
 Imperial Teen, rock band
 Chris Isaak (born 1956), singer and musician
 J Church, punk band

 Etta James (1938–2012), blues/R&B/soul icon
 Jawbreaker, punk/emo band

 Blake Schwarzenbach (born 1967), singer, songwriter & guitarist for Jawbreaker & Jets to Brazil

 Stephen Jenkins (born 1964), singer/songwriter for Third Eye Blind

 Janis Joplin (1943–1970), rock singer
 Jefferson Airplane, rock band
 Jefferson Starship, rock band
 Jessica Jung (born 1989), former member of pop group Girls' Generation
 Journey, rock band
 John Kahn (1947–1996), bassist for Jerry Garcia Band
 Paul Kantner (1941–2016) rock musician and co-founder of the band Jefferson Airplane
 Jorma Kaukonen (born 1940), guitarist for Jefferson Airplane & Hot Tuna
 Mark Kozelek (born 1967), singer/songwriter, Red House Painters & solo
 Kreayshawn (born 1989), rapper
 Kronos Quartet, classical ensemble

 Krystal Jung (born 1994), member of pop group f(x)

 Jay Lane (born 1964), drummer, RatDog, Furthur, Primus, Les Claypool's Frog Brigade, Sausage, The Uptones

 CoCo Lee, CantoPop singer and actress
 Maxime Le Forestier (born 1949), French singer/songwriter
 Huey Lewis (born 1950), Lead singer for Huey Lewis and the News
 The Little Deaths, rock band
 Courtney Love (born 1964), singer and actress
 Bamboo Mañalac (born 1978) rock singer, former lead vocals for Rivermaya and Bamboo (band), coach of The Voice Philippines
 Tony Martin (1913–2012), American actor and popular singer
 Mates of State, indie-pop duo
 Dmitri Matheny (born 1965), jazz flugelhornist
 Johnny Mathis (born 1935), pop singer
 Bobby McFerrin (born 1950), singer/songwriter
 Kirke Mechem (born 1925), composer
 Eric Melvin (born 1966), guitarist for NOFX
 Melvins, band
 The Mermen, surf-rock band
 Metal Church, heavy metal band
 Metallica, heavy metal band
 Cliff Burton (1962–1986), bass guitarist for thrash metal band Metallica
 Kirk Hammett (born 1962), lead guitarist for thrash metal band Metallica
 James Hetfield (born 1963), singer and rhythm guitarist for thrash metal band Metallica
 Lars Ulrich, (born 1963), drummer for thrash metal band Metallica
 Milk Cult, electronic band
 Moby, electronic music artist
 Moby Grape, rock band
 The Mojo Men, 1960s rock band
 Chante Moore (born 1967), R&B and jazz singer
 Sonny John Moore a.k.a. Skrillex (born 1988), electronic producer, DJ, musician
 Bob Mould (born 1960), singer/guitarist, Hüsker Dü, Sugar
 The Mummies, garage rock band
 Stuart Murdoch (born 1968), singer/songwriter, Belle & Sebastian
 The Mutants, early punk band
 The Mystery Trend, 1960s garage rock band
 Graham Nash (born 1942), singer, songwriter & guitarist for Crosby, Stills, Nash & Young and The Hollies
 Dan Nakamura a.k.a. Dan the Automator (born 1966), hip hop producer
 Matt Nathanson (born 1973), singer/musician
 Negative Trend, punk band
 New Riders of the Purple Sage, rock band
 Andre Nickatina (born 1970), rapper
 The Nuns, punk band
 The Oh Sees, garage rock band
 The Offs, punk band
 Christopher Olsen (born 1957), folk singer-songwriter
 The Ophelias, psychedelic rock band
 Bill Orcutt (born 1962), guitarist and composer
 Buzz Osborne (born 1964), singer/songwriter/guitarist with The Melvins
 Christopher Owens (born 1979), singer, songwriter

 Pablo Cruise, pop/rock band

 Pagan Babies, rock band
 Tim Pagnotta (born 1977), guitarist
 Pansy Division, punk band
 Mike Patton (born 1968), singer for Faith No More
 Linda Perry, lead singer of 4 Non Blondes
 Faith Petric (1915–2013), American folk singer
 Liz Phair (born 1967), singer/songwriter
 Phantom 309, noise rock band
 Polkacide, punk-polka band
 Quicksilver Messenger Service, rock band

 Rappin' 4-Tay (Anthony Forte) (born 1968), rapper

 RBL Posse, rap group
 Red House Painters, rock band
 The Residents, avant-garde music and visual arts group
 Tina Root, ex-vocalist of the now defunct darkwave band Switchblade Symphony
 Linda Ronstadt (born 1946), singer
 Arthur Russell (1951–1992), cellist, composer, producer, singer
 Doug Sahm (1941–1999), singer-songwriter
 Esa-Pekka Salonen (born 1958), Finnish orchestral conductor, composer, music director-designate of the San Francisco Symphony.
 San Quinn (born 1977) rapper, raised in the Western Addition, a neighborhood of San Francisco

 Carlos Santana (born 1947), rock, blues, salsa guitarist and singer

 Santana, rock band
 Michael Shrieve (born 1949), drummer for Santana
 Sister Double Happiness, punk band
 Ty Segall (born 1987), musician
 Boz Scaggs (born 1944), singer, songwriter, guitarist
 Deke Sharon (born 1967), a cappella singer The House Jacks
 Virgil Shaw, singer-songwriter, member of Brent's TV & Dieselhed
 Sic Alps, garage rock band
 Sir Douglas Quintet, rock band
 Grace Slick (born 1939), singer for Jefferson Airplane
 Sopwith Camel, 1960s psychedelic rock band
 Martin Sorrondeguy (born 1967), singer for Los Crudos & Limp Wrist, & founder of Lengua Armada Discos
 Skip Spence (1946–1999), singer-songwriter, and member of Jefferson Airplane, Quicksilver Messenger Service, and Moby Grape
 Sly Stone (born 1943), funk icon
 Steel Pole Bath Tub, noise-punk band
 Steve Miller Band, rock band
 The Stinky Puffs, alternative rock band
 Stone Fox, rock band
 Sun Kil Moon, folk rock band 
 Swingin' Utters, street punk band
 Sylvester (1947–1988), disco singer & performer
 Janice Tanaka (born 1963), bassist
 Third Eye Blind, alt-rock band
 Michael Tilson Thomas (born 1944), conductor
 Those Darn Accordions, accordion band
 Peter Tork (1942–2019), keyboardist and bassist for The Monkees
 Trainwreck Riders, alt-country punk band
 Tribe 8, queercore punk band
 The Tubes, new wave/punk band
 Two Gallants, guitar/drum duo
 Ross Valory (born 1949), bass player for many bands, most notably Journey
 John Vanderslice (born 1967), musician, songwriter, & recording engineer
 Sid Vicious (1957–1979), bassist for Sex Pistols
 Von Iva, electro soul-punk band
 Rob Wasserman (1952–2016), composer and bass player
 Martha Wash (born 1953), R&B, Soul, and pop singer
 George Watsky (born 1986), hip hop artist
 Linda Watson (soprano) (born 1960), dramatic soprano and academic voice teacher
 We Five, 1960s folk rock group
 White Trash Debutantes, punk band
 Betty Ann Wong, composer
 Kevin Woo (born 1991), member of Korean boygroup U-Kiss

News and commentary
 Ambrose Bierce (1842–1913), journalist
 Ben Blank (1921–2009), television graphics innovator
 Phil Bronstein (born 1950), editor of San Francisco Chronicle & San Francisco Examiner
 Herb Caen (1916–1997), newspaper columnist
 Tucker Carlson (born 1969), conservative political commentator for Fox News
 Ben Fong-Torres (born 1945), journalist, best known for work with Rolling Stone
 C.H. Garrigues (1902–1974), jazz reviewer

 William Randolph Hearst (1863–1951), newspaper magnate and publisher

 Lester Holt (born 1959), journalist and news anchor for the weekday edition of NBC Nightly News and Dateline NBC

 Gregg Jarrett (born 1955), news commentator with Fox News
 Whit Johnson (born 1982), journalist 
 Lewis Lapham (born 1935), editor of Harper's
 Rachel Maddow (born 1973), MSNBC host
 Kent Ninomiya (born 1966), journalist
 Jake Phelps (1962–2019), editor-in-chief of Thrasher Magazine
 Michael Savage (born 1942), radio personality and conservative political commentator
 Randy Shilts (1951–1994), pioneering gay journalist at San Francisco Chronicle and author of And the Band Played On, The Mayor of Castro Street and Conduct Unbecoming
 Lincoln Steffens (1866–1936), journalist 
 Kara Swisher (born 1962), technology journalist, New York Times writer, and co-founder of Recode and All Things Digital
 David Talbot (born 1951), creator of Salon.com, journalist
 Stephen Talbot (born 1949), reporter, producer, KQED and PBS Frontline 
 Marla Tellez (born 1976), journalist

 Jann Wenner (born 1946), Rolling Stone founder

 Tim Yohannan (1945–1998), founder of MaximumRockNRoll and 924 Gilman Street

Political figures, activists and civil servants

 Jeff Adachi (1959–2019), San Francisco Public Defender
 Jewett W. Adams (1835–1920), fourth Governor of Nevada; resident of San Francisco
 Art Agnos (born 1938), 38th Mayor of San Francisco
 Tom Ammiano (born 1941), California State Assemblyman, San Francisco Supervisor, Mayoral candidate and LGBT rights activist 
 Luis Antonio Argüello (1784–1830), first governor of Alta California
 Earle D. Baker (1888–1987), Los Angeles City Council member, 1951–59
 George W.C. Baker (1872–1953), Los Angeles City Council member, 1931–35
 John Perry Barlow (1948–2018), poet and essayist, cyberlibertarian political activist, Grateful Dead lyricist, and founding member of the Electronic Frontier Foundation and the Freedom of the Press Foundation
 London Breed, (born 1974), Mayor of San Francisco, (2017-)
 Stephen Breyer (born 1938), United States Supreme Court Associate Justice
 Jerry Brown (born 1938), former Governor of California, former Governor of California, former Mayor of Oakland, former California Attorney General
 Pat Brown (1905–1996), Governor of California
 Willie Brown (born 1934), Mayor of San Francisco, 1996–2004, Speaker of the California State Assembly, 1980–1995
 Christopher Augustine Buckley ("Blind Boss" Buckley, 1845–1922), Democratic Party boss
 Wayne M. Collins (1899–1974), civil rights attorney
 Belle Cora (Arabella Ryan), (1827–1862) Madam of the Barbary Coast, Vigilance Committee
 Ben Fee (1908) Chinese activist in San Francisco's Chinatown
 Dianne Feinstein (born 1933), San Francisco's first female mayor (1978–1988) and U.S. Senator since 1992
 Sandra Lee Fewer (born 1956/57), San Francisco Supervisor
 Joseph Flores (1900–1981), Governor of Guam
 John Gilmore (born 1955), co-founder of the Electronic Frontier Foundation, the Cypherpunks mailing list, and Cygnus Solutions, creator of the alt.* hierarchy in Usenet and is a major contributor to the GNU Project.
 C.J. Goodell (1885–1967), Associate Justice, California Court of Appeal (1945–1953)
 Terence Hallinan (1936–2020), San Francisco Supervisor and District Attorney
 Matt Haney (born 1982), San Francisco Supervisor
 Peter D. Hannaford (1932–2015), aide to Ronald Reagan; author, public relations consultant
 Kamala D. Harris (born 1964), San Francisco District Attorney (2004–2011), Attorney General of California (2011–2017), U.S. Senator from California (2017–2021), Vice President of the United States (2021-)
 George Hearst (1820–1891), politician
 Thomas Hixson, U.S. Magistrate Judge of the United States District Court for the Northern District of California
 Frank Jordan (born 1935), police chief and former Mayor of San Francisco
 Ed Lee (1952–2017), Mayor of San Francisco
 Mark Leno (born 1951), California State Senator, former San Francisco Supervisor, and mayoral candidate
 Monica Lewinsky (born 1973), activist and former White House intern, born in San Francisco
 Rafael Mandelman, San Francisco Supervisor
 Gordon Mar, San Francisco Supervisor
 Del Martin and Phyllis Lyon, activists, first same-sex couple to get a marriage license in San Francisco
 Robert McNamara (1916–2009), Secretary of Defense and CEO of Ford Motor Company
 Harvey Milk (1930–1978), city supervisor of San Francisco, gay icon
 George Moscone (1929–1978), attorney and Democratic politician, 37th mayor of San Francisco (1976–1978), "the people's mayor," California State Senator & majority leader (1967–1976).
 Gavin Newsom (born 1967), current Governor of California, former Mayor of San Francisco & Lieutenant Governor of California
 José de Jesús Noé (1805–1862), was the last alcalde of Yerba Buena, which became San Francisco after the Mexican–American War
 Michael O'Shaughnessy (1864–1934), civil engineer who became city engineer for the city of San Francisco during the first part of the twentieth century and developed the Hetch-Hetchy water system.
 Nancy Pelosi (born 1940), Congresswoman, former Speaker of the U.S. House of Representatives (2007-2011, 2019-2023)
 Aaron Peskin (born 1964), San Francisco Supervisor
 James Duval Phelan (1861–1930), civic leader and banker. Mayor of San Francisco from 1897 to 1902 U.S. Senator from 1915 to 1921. Central to effort to bring Hetch Hetchy & municipal water to San Francisco.
 Dean Preston (born 1969/70), San Francisco Supervisor
 Anthony Ribera (born 1945), Chief of San Francisco police department.
 James Rolph Jr. (1869–1934), 27th governor of California & 30th (and longest-serving) mayor of San Francisco.
 Hillary Ronen, San Francisco Supervisor
 John Roos (born 1955), former United States Ambassador to Japan under Barack Obama, technology lawyer, and CEO of Silicon Valley-based law firm of Wilson Sonsini Goodrich & Rosati.
 Angelo Rossi (1878–1948), 31st mayor of San Francisco
 Ahsha Safaí (born 1973), San Francisco Supervisor
 Charlotte Mailliard Shultz (born 1933), Chief of Protocol, Trustee San Francisco War Memorial and Performing Arts Center, widow of George Shultz
 George P. Shultz (1920-1933), Secretary of State under Ronald Reagan and Secretary of the Treasury, Secretary of Labor & Director of the Office of Management and Budget under Richard Nixon
 Theresa Sparks (born 1949) activist, former president of the San Francisco Police Commission, business woman
 Catherine Stefani (born 1969), San Francisco Supervisor
 Shamann Walton, San Francisco Supervisor
 Edgar Wayburn (1906–2010), environmentalist, five-time president of the Sierra Club
 Caspar Weinberger (1917–2006), Secretary of Defense
 Cecil Williams (born 1929), pastor and community leader
 Norman Yee (born 1949), San Francisco Supervisor

Scientists 
 Augustus Jesse Bowie Jr. (1872–1955), technology engineer, inventor and entrepreneur
 Mary E. Clark (1927–2019), biologist, professor, Fellow of the American Association for the Advancement of Science
 Peter Eckersley (1979–2022), computer scientist, computer security researcher, and activist
 Paul Ekman (born 1934), pioneer in the study of emotions and their relation to facial expressions
 Laura J. Esserman, surgeon and breast cancer oncology specialist who practices at the University of California, San Francisco School of Medicine.
 Dian Fossey (1932–1985), primatologist, researcher and animal advocate
 Clifford Geertz (1926–2006), anthropologist
 Eugene Gu (born 1986), doctor and CEO of Ganogen Research Institute Also a news media writer, born in San Francisco.
Mary Halton (1879–1948), suffragist, doctor and early IUD researcher, she was the first women appointed to the Harvard Medical School faculty. Born and raised in San Francisco.
 Stephen Herrero, biologist, bear expert, professor at University of Calgary
 Duncan Irschick (born 1969), evolutionary ecologist in animal performance
 Daniel Levitin (born 1957) cognitive psychologist, neuroscientist, writer, musician, and record producer
 Gabriel L. Plaa (1930–2009), toxicologist
 Mervyn Silverman, physician and public health supervisor of San Francisco during the city's initial response to the AIDS crisis
 Kazue Togasaki (1897–1992) Japanese woman who served as a medical doctor in Japanese internment camps
 Paul Volberding, American physician known for his pioneering work in treating persons with HIV
 Robert Wartenberg (1887–1956) neurologist and clinical professor of neurology at the University of California
 John W. Young (1930–2018), astronaut, ninth person to walk on the Moon

Socialites 
 Marian and Vivian Brown (1927–2013, 2014), identical twin socialites and locally known San Francisco personalities
 Abigail Folger (1943–1969), Folgers coffee heiress and victim of the Tate murders
 Gordon Getty (born 1933), heir to oil tycoon J. Paul Getty, philanthropists, classical music composer, business man, born and raised in San Francisco
Noël Sullivan (1890–1956), concert singer, philanthropist and patron of the arts, born and raised in San Francisco.
 Charlotte Mailliard Shultz (born 1933), philanthropist, socialite
 Tabe Slioor (1926–2006), socialite, news reporter, photojournalist

Writers

 Maya Angelou (1928–2014), poet
 Julian Bagley (1892–1981), author, veteran and hotel concierge
 William Bayer (born 1939), crime fiction writer
 David Belasco (1853–1931), playwright
 Ambrose Bierce (1842 – c. 1914), journalist and author
 Clark Blaise (born 1940), Canadian author
 Richard Brautigan (1935–1984), poet, writer
 Neal Cassady (1926–1968), beatnik poet, husband of Carolyn Cassady
 Carolyn Cassady (1923–2013), writer, wife of Neal Cassady
 Eli Coppola (1961–2000), poet and spoken word performer
 Diane di Prima (1934–2020), poet
 Greg Downs (born 1971), short-story writer
 Robert Duncan (1919–1988), poet
 Dave Eggers (born 1970), author
 Jeffrey Eugenides (born 1960), author
 Marcus Ewert (born 1972), writer, actor, and director
 Lawrence Ferlinghetti (1919–2021), poet, co-founder of City Lights Bookstore
 Robert Frost (1874–1963), iconic poet
 Adam Gidwitz (born 1982), children's book author
 Allen Ginsberg (1926–1997), iconic poet of the beat generation
 Clay Meredith Greene (1850–1933), playwright, director, actor
 Thom Gunn (1929–2004), poet
 Dashiell Hammett (1894–1961), author of hard-boiled detective novels
 Daniel Handler (born 1970), better known as Lemony Snicket
 George Hitchcock (1914–2010) Poet, playwright, actor, professor, editor of the San Francisco-based Kayak poetry journal, lived in San Francisco from 1958 until 1970.
 Jack Hirschman (born 1933), poet
 Robert Hunter (1941–2019), Grateful Dead lyricist
 Shirley Jackson (1916–1965), author
 Alan Kaufman (born 1952), author, poet, editor
 Bob Kaufman, (1925–1986), poet
 Joanne Kyger, 1934–2017, poet, writer
 Gus Lee (born 1946), Asian-American author
 Philip Lamantia (1927–2005), poet
 Daniel Levitin (born 1957), writer, scientist, musician
 Ron Loewinsohn (1937–2014), poet, novelist
 Jack London (1876–1916), writer
 Ki Longfellow (born 1944), writer
 Devorah Major (active since 1990s), poet, novelist
 Armistead Maupin (born 1944), writer
 Midori, author and sex educator
 Carol Anne O'Marie (1933–2009), Roman Catholic nun, mystery writer
 Emelie Tracy Y. Swett Parkhurst (1863–1892), poet and author
 Peter Plate, author
 Charles Plymell (born 1935),  poet, novelist, and small press publisher
 Kenneth Rexroth (1905–1982), poet
 Anne Rice (1941–2021), author
 Gary Snyder (born 1930), poet of the beat generation
 Rebecca Solnit (born 1961), writer
 Lorenzo Sosso (1867–1965), Italian-American poet
 Jack Spicer (1925–1965), poet of the beat generation, lived in the 1950s and 1960s in San Francisco and died in San Francisco
 Joseph Staten, writer (Halo: Contact Harvest)
 Danielle Steel (born 1947), author
 Dale J. Stephens, author
 Robert Louis Stevenson (1850–1894), author, lived in San Francisco from 1879 to 1880
 Amy Tan (born 1952), author
 Michelle Tea (born 1971), author, poet, editor
 Walter Tevis (1928–1994), author, The Hustler
 Robert Alfred Theobald (1884–1957), US Navy Rear Admiral, author of The Final Secret of Pearl Harbor
 Alice B. Toklas (1877–1967), cookbook author, partner to Gertrude Stein, born and lived in San Francisco
 Mark Twain (1835–1910), author
 Vendela Vida (born 1971), writer
 Lew Welch, (1926 – disappeared 1971), poet
 Philip Whalen (1923–2002), poet
 Oscar Wilde (1854–1900), author and playwright, spent 1882 in San Francisco
 Naomi Wolf (born 1962), writer
 Curtis Yarvin (born 1973), American political theorist and computer scientist
 Laurence Yep (born 1948), Asian-American writer
 Helen Zia (born 1952), writer, journalist, and activist

Athletes

Baseball
See San Francisco Giants#Baseball Hall of Famers for San Francisco Giants players in the Baseball Hall of Fame.
 Jim Baxes (1928–1996), third baseman
 Ping Bodie (1887–1961), outfielder, played for the Chicago White Sox (1911–1914), Philadelphia Athletics (1917) and New York Yankees (1919–1921), born and raised in San Francisco
 Sam Bohne (originally "Sam Cohen"; 1896–1977), Major League Baseball player
 Barry Bonds (born 1964), outfielder
 Bobby Bonds (1946–2003), outfielder
 Fred Breining (born 1955), pitcher for San Francisco Giants (1980–1984)
 Madison Bumgarner (born 1988), pitcher for San Francisco Giants
 Matt Cain (born 1984), pitcher
 Dolph Camilli (1907–1997), first baseman, played for the Philadelphia Phillies and Brooklyn Dodgers, born and raised in San Francisco
 Ike Caveney (1894–1949), shortstop
 Orlando Cepeda (born 1937), 1st baseman & inductee into the Baseball Hall of Fame
 Gino Cimoli (1929–2011), outfielder, born and raised in San Francisco
 Joe Corbett (1875–1945), pitcher, born in San Francisco
 Joe Cronin (1906–1984), infielder, Baseball Hall of Fame, born and raised in San Francisco
 Frankie Crosetti (1910–2002), shortstop and coach
 Tim Cullen (born 1942), infielder
 Babe Dahlgren (1912–1996), first baseman
 Joe DeMaestri (1928–2016), shortstop
 Dom DiMaggio (1917–2009), outfielder
 Bob Elliott (1916–1966), player and manager
 Jim Fregosi (1942–2014), player and manager
 Al Gallagher (1945–2018), third baseman for the San Francisco Giants and California Angels (1970–1973)
 Jonny Gomes (born 1980), outfielder for Boston Red Sox
 Herb Gorman (1924–1953), player in one MLB game
 Harry Heilmann (1894–1951), outfielder, Baseball Hall of Fame
 Keith Hernandez (born 1953), first baseman
 Jackie Jensen (1927–1982), also in the College Football Hall of Fame
 Eddie Joost (1916–2011), player and manager
 Willie Kamm (1900–1988), third baseman
 George Kelly (1895–1984), first baseman, Baseball Hall of Fame
 Steve Kerr (born 1965) head coach of the Golden State Warriors and eight-time NBA champion
 Mark Koenig (1904–1993), infielder for 1927 New York Yankees
 Tony Lazzeri (1903–1946), infielder, Baseball Hall of Fame
 Tim Lincecum (born 1984), pitcher
 Willie McCovey (1938–2018), 1st baseman & inductee into the Baseball Hall of Fame
 Nyjer Morgan (born 1980), outfielder for Milwaukee Brewers
 Hunter Pence (born 1983), outfielder
 Mark Prior (born 1980), baseball pitcher for Chicago Cubs (2002–2004), born in San Francisco
 Charlie Sweeney (1863–1902), pitcher
 Mike Vail (born 1951), outfielder
 Tyler Walker (born 1976), relief pitcher for Washington Nationals

Basketball
 Jason Kidd (born 1973), basketball player
 Tom Meschery (born 1938)
 Pete Newell (1915–2008), Olympic and USF coach
 Gary Payton (born 1968), NBA player
 Phil Smith (1952–2002)
 Phil Woolpert (1915–1987), San Francisco high school and college coach

Boxing
 Abe Attell (1883–1970), world featherweight champion
 James J. Corbett (1866–1933), World Heavyweight Champion
 Andre Ward (born 1984), 2004 Olympics light heavyweight gold medal winner

Football
 Andre Alexander (born 1967), CFL wide receiver
 Gary Beban (born 1946), NFL quarterback and 1967 Heisman Trophy winner
 Ed Berry (born 1963), NFL defensive back for Green Bay Packers and San Diego Chargers
 Tom Brady (born 1977), NFL quarterback for New England Patriots and two-time NFL most valuable player
 Tedy Bruschi (born 1973), NFL linebacker for New England Patriots
 Al Cowlings (born 1947), USC and NFL defensive lineman
 Chris Darkins (born 1974), NFL running back for Green Bay Packers
 Bob deLauer (1920–2002), NFL center
 Matt Dickerson (born 1995), NFL defensive end for the Atlanta Falcons
 Eddie Forrest (1921–2001), NFL offensive lineman for San Francisco 49ers
 Jason Hill (born 1985), NFL wide receiver for Jacksonville Jaguars
 Mike Holmgren (born 1948), NFL head coach for Green Bay Packers and president of Cleveland Browns
 James Hundon (born 1971), NFL player
 Zeph Lee (born 1963), NFL player
 Joe Montana (born 1956), NFL quarterback for San Francisco 49ers, inductee into Pro Football Hall of Fame
 John Nisby (1936–2011), NFL guard with the Pittsburgh Steelers and Washington Redskins; one of the first African American players to play for the Washington Redskins
 Paul Oglesby (1939–1994), Oakland Raiders tackle
 Igor Olshansky (born 1982), NFL defensive end for Dallas Cowboys
 Jerry Rice (born 1962), NFL wide receiver for San Francisco 49ers, inductee into Pro Football Hall of Fame
 George Seifert (born 1940), Head Coach of the San Francisco 49ers (1989–1996), Carolina Panthers (1999–2001)
 O. J. Simpson (born 1947), NFL running back with Buffalo Bills and San Francisco 49ers (1985); inductee into Pro Football Hall of Fame; previously, City College of San Francisco and USC running back
 Donald Strickland (born 1980), current NFL cornerback for the New York Jets
 Eric Wright (born 1985), NFL cornerback for Detroit Lions
 Steve Young (born 1961), NFL quarterback for San Francisco 49ers, inductee into Pro Football Hall of Fame

Golf
 Danielle Kang (born 1992), professional golfer
 Johnny Miller (born 1947), professional golfer, TV commentator
 Ken Venturi (1931–2013), professional golfer, TV commentator
 Michelle Wie (born 1989), professional golfer

Other sports
 Townsend Bell (born 1975), race car driver
 Otey Cannon (born 1968), first black American player in the North American Soccer League
 Cheerleader Melissa (born 1982), pro wrestler
 Mark Crear (born 1969), two-time Olympic medallist in 110m hurdles
 Ann Curtis (1926–2012), two-time Olympic gold medalist and one-time silver medalist in swimming
 Vicki Draves (1924–2010), two-time Olympic gold medalist, diver, first Asian American gold medalist
 Ken Flax (born 1963), Olympic hammer thrower
 Al Gordon (1902–1936), race car driver
 Laird Hamilton (born 1964), surfer
 Hans Halberstadt (1885–1966), German-born American Olympic fencer
 Helen Jacobs (1908–1997), tennis player
 Jeremy McGrath (born 1971), motocross rider
 Jonny Moseley (born 1975), freestyle skiing Olympic gold medalist
 Jimmy Murphy (1894–1924), race car driver
 Katelyn Ohashi (born 1997), artistic gymnast 
 Brooks Orpik (born 1980), NHL player for the Washington Capitals
 Shannon Rowbury (born 1984), 2-time track & field Olympian, American Record Holder at 1500m, World Record Holder in Distance Medley Relay

 Bill Schaadt (1924–1995), fly fisherman

 Emerson Spencer (1906–1985), Olympic track and field gold medalist
 Shawn Spikes (born 1996), thoroughbred jockey
 Ben Wildman-Tobriner (born 1984), Olympic swimming gold medalist 
 Al Young (born 1946), drag racing world champion

Other
 Brace Belden (born 1989), columnist, militiaman, union organizer, Twitter personality
 Maciej Cegłowski (born 1975), web developer, entrepreneur, speaker, and social critic
 Thomas E. Horn (born 1946), lawyer, philanthropist, Publisher Bay Area Reporter, Trustee San Francisco War Memorial and Performing Arts Center
 Laurene Powell Jobs (born 1963), widow of Steve Jobs, founder of Emerson Collective
 Anton LaVey (1930–1997), founder of the Church of Satan, author, musician and occultist, lived and died in San Francisco

 Eleanor Dumont (Madame Moustache) (1829–1879), Gold Rush era professional card dealer and gambler

 Emperor Norton (1818–1880), Gold Rush entrepreneur, eccentric, egalitarian and original visionary of the San Francisco-Oakland Bay Bridge

 Maria Seise, first Chinese woman to immigrate to California
 Owsley Stanley (1935–2011), American audio engineer and clandestine chemist
 Tye Leung Schulze (1887–1972), interpreter and first Chinese-American woman to vote in a US primary election
 Neville G. Pemchekov Warwick (1932–1993), modern interpreter of Buddhism and a central figure of the spiritual movement of California during the late 1960s and the 1970s.
 Jacob Weisman (born 1965), publisher of Tachyon Publications, editor

See also

 List of people from Berkeley, California 
 List of people from Oakland, California 
 List of people from Palo Alto
 List of people from San Jose, California
 List of people from Santa Cruz, California

References

San Francisco, California
People
San Francisco